Leonid Nisonovich Vaserstein is a Russian-American mathematician, currently Professor of Mathematics at Penn State University. His research is focused on algebra and dynamical systems. He is well known for providing a simple proof of the Quillen–Suslin theorem, a result in commutative algebra, first conjectured by Jean-Pierre Serre in 1955, and then proved by Daniel Quillen and Andrei Suslin in 1976.

Leonid Vaserstein got his Master's degree and doctorate in Moscow State University, where he was until 1978. He then moved to Europe and United States.

Alternate forms of the last name: Vaseršteĭn, Vasershtein, Wasserstein.

The Wasserstein metric was named after him by R.L. Dobrushin in 1970.

Biography

Leonid Vaserstein grew up in the Soviet Union. In secondary school he won the second prize in the All-Russian High School Mathematical Olympiad. Vaserstein got his undergraduate, masters (1966), and doctoral degrees (1969) in mathematics from Moscow State University, where he worked as a lecturer concurrently with his doctoral research. After his doctoral graduation he worked for the Moscow State University-associated "Informelectro" Institute, a Federal State Unitary Enterprise focused on ways to develop industries in Russia with emphases on electrical engineering, energy efficiency, and environmental technologies like greenhouse gas mitigation. He started as a senior researcher for Informelectro and continued working there until 1978, eventually becoming head of his department. In 1978 and 1979 he made his way to the United States of America by way of Europe, taking a series of visiting professor positions at the University of Bielefeld, Institut des Hautes Études Scientifiques, University of Chicago, and Cornell University. In 1979, Vaserstein took a full-time position as a professor in the Department of Mathematics at Penn State University.

Vaserstein's research interests extend across the areas of topology, algebra, and number theory, and the applications of these areas, including classical groups over rings, algebraic K-theory, systems with local interactions, and optimization and planning. Additionally, Vaserstein maintains the Penn State University Math Department's  website on Algebra and Number Theory.

Selected publications

See also
 List of Russian mathematicians

References

External links
 
 A web page about Leonid N. Vaserstein's publications
 Leonid N. Vaserstein home page

Living people
Moscow State University alumni
Russian mathematicians
Pennsylvania State University faculty
Year of birth missing (living people)